Bryan White is an American country music artist. In his career, he has released six studio albums and a greatest hits package, all on Asylum Records, as well as two Christmas-themed EPs, one of which was also issued on Asylum. His first two studio albums — his 1994 self-titled debut and 1996's Between Now and Forever — were both certified platinum by the RIAA for shipping one million copies in the US, while 1997's The Right Place was certified gold by the RIAA.

His releases for Asylum have accounted for 15 singles on the Billboard country singles charts. Of these, six reached Number One: "Someone Else's Star" (1995), "Rebecca Lynn" (1996), "So Much for Pretending" (1996), and "Sittin' on Go" (1997). "So Much for Pretending" is the longest-lasting of these four, with a two-week stay at Number One. Two additional Top Ten hits, 1996's "I'm Not Supposed to Love You Anymore" "From This Moment On" with Shania Twain, and 1997's "Love Is the Right Place", peaked at #4 on the same chart.

White has also charted a Christmas single, 1999's "Holiday Inn", as well as two guest singles. The first of these was a multi-artist charity single entitled "One Heart at a Time", and the second was a duet vocal on Shania Twain's "From This Moment On." Although this song crossed over to the Billboard Hot 100, White did not receive chart credit for it outside the country charts in the United States.

Studio albums

Compilation albums

Extended plays

Singles

Other singles

Guest singles

Other charted songs

Music videos

Guest appearances

References

Country music discographies
 
 
Discographies of American artists